Stephen Henry Lewis  (born November 11, 1937) is a Canadian politician, public speaker, broadcaster, and diplomat. He was the leader of the social democratic Ontario New Democratic Party for most of the 1970s.

During many of those years as leader, his father David Lewis was simultaneously the leader of the federal New Democratic Party. After politics, he became a broadcaster on both CBC Radio and Toronto's Citytv. In the mid-1980s, he was appointed as Canada's United Nations ambassador, by Progressive Conservative Prime Minister Brian Mulroney. He quit in 1988 and worked at various United Nations agencies during the 1990s. In the 2000s, he served a term as the United Nations' special envoy for HIV/AIDS in Africa. In 2003, he gained investiture into the Order of Canada. As of 2014, he is a distinguished visiting professor at Toronto Metropolitan University.

Early life and education
Lewis was born in Ottawa, Ontario, on November 11, 1937, to Sophie Lewis (née Carson) and David Lewis. His parents gave him the Hebrew name "Sholem", a Yiddish derivation of the Hebrew word shalom, which means peace, because he was born on Armistice Day. From the time he was born, and through his early childhood, his father was the national secretary of the Co-operative Commonwealth Federation (CCF), the predecessor party to the NDP. When his family moved to Toronto in 1950, he attended  secondary school first at Toronto's Oakwood Collegiate Institute, and then his final three years of high school at Harbord Collegiate Institute.  In 1956, he entered the University of Toronto (UofT) where he became a member of the Hart House debating committee, and on 14 November 1957, debated the senator and future American president, John F. Kennedy, on the question, "Has the United States failed in its responsibilities as a world leader?" The Senator narrowly beat the Hart House team 204–194. Lewis's performance was considered the highlight of the event, while Kennedy's was flat according to many members in the audience like John Brewin. He spent his third year of university at the University of British Columbia (UBC) before spending his final undergraduate year back at UofT, where he failed to write his final examinations.  He went to law school twice in the early 1960s, dropping out of both UofT and UBC's programs.

Political career
He left his studies in the 1960s and took up a clerical position with the Socialist International, where he received an invitation to a conference in Ghana. He attended, and instead of returning to Canada, spent more than a year working, traveling, and teaching in various places in Africa. He recalled in his 2005 Massey Lectures that the relatively brief sojourn would be a key influence on his life, especially after the turn of the new millennium.

He came back to Canada at the instigation of Tommy Douglas, and in 1963, at the age of 26, he was elected to the Legislative Assembly of Ontario. Following the engineered 1970 resignation of Donald C. MacDonald, Lewis was elected leader of the Ontario New Democratic Party. His initial experience at the helm in the 1971 provincial election was a disappointment, with the party slipping from 20 seats to 19.

A radical left wing group nicknamed The Waffle had gained prominence, with one of its leaders, James Laxer, winning one-third of the vote when he ran to be leader of the federal NDP in 1971. Lewis felt that The Waffle was threatening the credibility and stability of the party and supported a movement against the group in June 1972 on the basis that it was a party within a party.

In 1974, Lewis supported the Elliot Lake miners and advocated to Ontario Premier Bill Davis for the creation of the Royal Commission on the Health and Safety of Workers in Mines. The commission's recommendations led to the creation of the Occupational Health and Safety Act in 1979.

Lewis led a strong campaign during the 1975 election with his oratory and passion bringing new supporters to the party. The NDP highlighted issues such as rent control and workplace safety. Each day, Lewis told the story of a different Ontarian in trouble, making a case that this was because of the lack of adequate legislation. Polls showed the NDP surging and the incumbent Ontario Progressive Conservative Party in freefall and in the course of the campaign Premier William Davis was forced to commit his party to bringing in rent control and other progressive reforms in order to retain power. When the ballots were counted the Tories were reduced to a minority government. Lewis' NDP had doubled its seats from 19 to 38, surpassing the Ontario Liberal Party to become the Official Opposition. To some it appeared that it was only a matter of time before the NDP would form the government.

The next election, in 1977, proved to be a disappointment. The growth of support for the NDP stalled, and while the Tories were kept to a minority, the NDP failed to make any gains. The party was reduced to 33 seats and lost its status as Official Opposition to the Liberals. In 1978, a frustrated Lewis stepped down as party leader and as a Member of Provincial Parliament.

After leaving politics, Lewis served as an arbitrator with the Ontario Ministry of Labour and was a commentator on TV station CITY-TV's CityPulse News and CKEY radio in Toronto and appeared nationally with Dalton Camp and Eric Kierans as part of a weekly political panel on Peter Gzowski's CBC Radio show, Morningside. He would return to the Morningside panel in the late 1980s. In 1982, Lewis won the Gordon Sinclair Award from ACTRA for his commentary on CKEY.

Diplomatic and academic career

After working for several years as a labour mediator, columnist and broadcaster, in 1984 Lewis was appointed Permanent Representative of Canada to the United Nations by Governor General Jeanne Sauvé, on the advice of Prime Minister Brian Mulroney. Lewis served at the post until 1988.

From 1995 to 1999, Lewis was deputy director of UNICEF. From 2001 until 2006, he worked as United Nations Special Envoy for HIV/AIDS in Africa. In this role, he drew attention to the HIV/AIDS crisis and convinced leaders and the public that they have a responsibility to respond. He has been widely praised for his effectiveness in this role. In 2005 he adapted his Massey Lectures in a book titled "Race Against Time", where he describes the disjuncture between what the international community promises and their actions in responding to the pandemic in Africa.

In May 2006, Lewis joined the Faculty of Social Sciences at McMaster University as a scholar-in-residence. Also in 2006, he was elected a senior fellow of Massey College in the University of Toronto. In 2009, Lewis strongly criticized Pope Benedict XVI's assertion that condom use only makes the AIDS crisis worse.

Stephen Lewis Foundation
Lewis is chair of the board of the Stephen Lewis Foundation, a non-profit organization that helps people affected and infected by HIV/AIDS in Africa.

In October 2009, to raise money for the foundation, Lewis helped with a campaign to dare Canadians to do something for Africa called A Dare to Remember. The campaign saw Lewis, along with musician k-os, Federal NDP leader Jack Layton, Olympic gold medalist Duff Gibson and many other Canadians, performing various dares for the event.  He faced his own personal fears as part of the campaign, and sang live on CBC's The Hour with the band the Arkells.

AIDS-Free World
In 2007, Stephen Lewis and long-time colleague Paula Donovan co-founded AIDS-Free World, a non-profit organization that advocates for more effective global responses to HIV and AIDS.

As a preventative HIV/AIDS strategy, Lewis has made a somewhat controversial call for male circumcision when African boys receive the first of two UN-administered measles vaccination shots, so that their recovery progress can be monitored at the time of the second vaccination.  Many studies have been conducted into the role circumcision can play in reducing the spread of HIV.

Personal
Stephen Lewis is the son of former federal NDP leader David Lewis and the grandson of Moishe Lewis (1888–1950), an activist in the Jewish Bund in Russia and the Jewish Labour Committee in Montreal.

Lewis has three siblings. Two of them were active and high-ranking officials within the Ontario NDP during the 1980s and 1990s: Michael Lewis was the secretary, and Janet Solberg was the president. His second sister is Nina Lewis-Libeskind, the wife and partner of world-renowned architect Daniel Libeskind.

Lewis is married to journalist Michele Landsberg. Their son is broadcaster Avi Lewis, who married journalist and author Naomi Klein. Their daughters are Ilana Naomi Landsberg-Lewis and Jenny Leah Lewis; Ilana serves as executive director of the Stephen Lewis Foundation.

In 2021, Lewis publicly revealed that he is undergoing experimental treatment for inoperable abdominal cancer, which recurred three years after surgery for an earlier occurrence of the disease.

Honours
For his humanitarian work in Africa and the United Nations, the governor general of Canada appointed Lewis a Companion of the Order of Canada on October 10, 2002. His investiture into the order was held on October 23, 2003.  He delivered the annual Massey Lecture in 2005, and it was published in book form under the title  Race Against Time: Searching for Hope in AIDS-Ravaged Africa. The book consists of five lectures that depict the HIV/AIDS pandemic in Africa, critically examining the international community's passivity as a contributing factor.

In 2006, two new secondary schools in the Toronto area were named after Lewis: Stephen Lewis Secondary School in Mississauga and Stephen Lewis Secondary School in Vaughan. The Mississauga school has a special focus on educating students on issues relating to social justice and global citizenship to enhance the Ontario Curriculum.

In 2007, Lewis received the World Citizenship Award, from the World Association of Girl Guides and Girl Scouts, as well as the Health and Human Rights Leadership Award from Doctors of the World-USA.   Lewis was also invested as a Knight Commander of the Most Dignified Order of Moshoeshoe by King Letsie III of Lesotho.

In 2010, Forbes magazine, in conjunction with their 2010 list of World's Most Powerful People, asked the feminist playwright Eve Ensler to identify Worlds' Most Powerful Feminists. She named Stephen Lewis as one of her top seven.

In 2013, The Mark S. Bonham Centre for Sexual Diversity Studies at the University of Toronto presented Stephen Lewis with the Bonham Centre Award, recognizing his contribution to the advancement and education of human rights issues surrounding sexual education.

Lewis has 33 honorary degrees, 32 from Canadian institutions. This is one of the largest held by any Canadian.

References

Bibliography

External links

The Stephen Lewis Foundation
Stephen Lewis interviewed on Conversations from Penn State
Audio "Editor's Choice" podcast episodes of Lewis's Massey Lecture series from CBC Radio (MP3 files): Part 1: Context, Part 2: Pandemic, Part 3: Education, Part 4: Women, Part 5: Solutions
World Issues - Local Impact (Feb 2006) – video and audio file of a speech given at the University of British Columbia.
 Lewis at The Canadian Encyclopedia

1937 births
HIV/AIDS activists
Canadian activists
Companions of the Order of Canada
Permanent Representatives of Canada to the United Nations
HIV/AIDS in Africa
Jewish Canadian politicians
Leaders of the Ontario New Democratic Party
Living people
Academic staff of McMaster University
Ontario New Democratic Party MPPs
Politicians from Ottawa
Canadian officials of the United Nations
University of Toronto alumni
Canadian people of Belarusian-Jewish descent
Jewish Canadian writers
Stephen
Writers from Ottawa
Canadian Screen Award winning journalists
Special Envoys of the Secretary-General of the United Nations